Veauville-lès-Baons is a former commune in the Seine-Maritime department in the Normandy region in northern France. On 1 January 2019, it was merged into the new commune Les Hauts-de-Caux.

Geography
The A29 autoroute passes through the commune's borders.

Population

Places of interest
 The church of St. Austreberthe, dating from the sixteenth century.
 The chapel of St. Gilles, dating from the fifteenth century.
 A sixteenth-century stone cross at the crossroads.
 A 30-foot high granite cross, erected in 1874.

Notable people
Claudine Loquen(1965-), painter and sculptor has lived in Veauville-lès-Baons (from 1976 to 2007)

See also
Communes of the Seine-Maritime department

References

Former communes of Seine-Maritime